Lee Ae-jung (March 17, 1987 – September 6, 2007), was a South Korean actress.

Biography

Career
Lee started her career as a child actress while in elementary school, and in 1999 while in 6th grade appeared in Little Prince. She rose to prominence for her role in Autumn Fairy Tale in 2000.

Death
Lee was diagnosed with brain cancer in July 2006, while in her first semester at Hanyang University, and underwent two surgeries at Seoul National University Hospital. She died on September 6, 2007, at the age of 20, at the countryside hospital where she spent her last days.

Filmography

Television dramas
Seoul Tango (SBS, 1998)
Little Prince (KBS, 1999)
Autumn Fairy Tale (KBS2, 2000) as the younger Shin-ae
Four Sisters (MBC, 2001)
Beautiful Days (SBS, 2001) as Shin Jae-eun
Jump (EBS, 2005)

References

External links
 

1987 births
2007 deaths
South Korean child actresses
South Korean television actresses
20th-century South Korean actresses
21st-century South Korean actresses
Actresses from Seoul